Ray B. Mangrum (June 17, 1910 – April 2, 1975) was an American professional golfer and the older brother of a more famous golfer, Lloyd Mangrum.

Mangrum began his golf career in the 1920s as a club professional in Dallas, Texas, eventually becoming the head professional at Cliff-Dale Country Club. He and Lloyd moved from Texas to Los Angeles in the 1930s hoping that the move would raise their visibility and enhance their careers. In Los Angeles in the 1940s, Mangrum mentored Ted Rhodes, a trailblazing African-American golfer.

Mangrum won five PGA Tour events in the 1930s and 1940s. His best finishes in major championships were T4 at the 1935 U.S. Open and T6 at the Masters.

Professional wins

PGA Tour wins (5)
1936 (2) Wildwood Open, Oregon Open
1937 (1) Miami Open (January)
1945 (1) Tucson Open
1946 (1) Pensacola Open

Other wins
1935 Pennsylvania Open Championship
1939 Pennsylvania Open Championship

References

American male golfers
PGA Tour golfers
Golfers from Texas
1910 births
1975 deaths